"Best Friend" is a song by American rapper Saweetie, featuring fellow American rapper and singer Doja Cat, released on January 7, 2021 as the third single from the upcoming debut studio album Pretty Bitch Music. The song was written by the two performers along with Asia Smith, Kaine, Theron Thomas,  and producers Dr. Luke and Rocco Did It Again!.

The song's first official remix features vocals from British rapper Stefflon Don, while the second features Chinese rapper VaVa. A third, with New Zealand rapper JessB and Australian singer Okenyo, a fourth, with South Korean singer Jamie and South Korean/Japanese rapper Chanmina, and fifth, with German rapper Katja Krasavice, were also released. The latter debuted at number one in Germany, becoming the first number-one single there for both Saweetie and Doja Cat. The single also won Saweetie her first Video Music Award for Best Art Direction. The song also received a nomination for Best Rap Song at the 64th Annual Grammy Awards.

Background and release
On December 4, 2020, "Best Friend" was released prematurely on streaming platforms. Saweetie later took to social media to express her disappointment in her record label, Warner Records, in regards to handling the release. She stated: "I am extremely disappointed in my label WBR for prematurely releasing a single I was so excited about. I feel disrespected. I'm hands on with ALL of my creative & had such a dope rollout for 'best friends'. The thirst for clout & $ is real & it overrides the artists' art." The single was later taken off streaming services the following day. "Best Friend" was then officially released on January 7, 2021 for digital download and streaming. The track was sent to both contemporary hit radio and rhythmic contemporary radio in the United States on January 12, 2021.

Composition and reception 
The hip hop song was described as a "danceable", "club-ready", and "fun, uptempo record that celebrates friendship." Lyrically the rappers highlight and hype up each other's beauty, success, independence, wealth, and loyalty.

Accolades

Music video
Filmed in November 2020, The Dave Meyers directed music video was released alongside the song on January 7, 2021. The video consists of Saweetie and Doja Cat in various settings including driving and posing in front of a bedazzled Tesla as well as jumping off of a cliff into the ocean. The video also features an appearance from Canadian comedian King Bach. Althea Legaspi of Rolling Stone noted that they call out misogyny and celebrate camaraderie in the music video. Upon release, Saweetie was accused of stealing the concept of the music video from "BFF" by R&B duo Ceraadi. As of November 2022, the music video has 241 million views on YouTube.

Charts

Weekly charts

Year-end charts

Certifications

Release history

Footnotes

References

2021 singles
2021 songs
Saweetie songs
Doja Cat songs
Number-one singles in Germany
Song recordings produced by Dr. Luke
Songs written by Dr. Luke
Songs written by Doja Cat
Songs written by Saweetie
Songs written by Theron Thomas
Warner Records singles
Music videos directed by Dave Meyers (director)
Songs about loyalty
Songs about friendship
Songs about dancing
Pop-rap songs
Songs about alcohol